Elling Rønes (28 July 1882 – 12 September 1965) is a Norwegian cross-country skier who won the men's 50 km event in 1906 (40 km), 1907, 1908, and 1916 at the Holmenkollen ski festival. Born in Trysil, he was the first person to win the 50 km event at the Holmenkollen three times. Rønes would be belatedly awarded the Holmenkollen medal in 1947.

References
Holmenkollen medalists - click Holmenkollmedaljen for downloadable pdf file 
Holmenkollen winners since 1892 - click Vinnere for downloadable pdf file 

Holmenkollen medalists
Holmenkollen Ski Festival winners
Norwegian male cross-country skiers
People from Trysil
1882 births
1965 deaths
Sportspeople from Innlandet